Corruption in Eritrea is a considered a deeply serious and growing problem. The level of corruption used to be considerably lower in Eritrea than in many other African countries. Indeed, it was traditionally viewed as having a “strong ‘anti-corruption’ culture” and considered relatively “egalitarian and corruption-free.” In 2006, a report by Bertelsmann Stiftung stated that corruption, as of that date, was not a serious problem within Eritrea. While noting that there had been “cases of corruption since independence,” they existed on a negligible level, although politically-motivated corruption allegations have been made. But, in fact, corruption is said to have been growing steadily worse ever since 1998, when, not long after the end of its decades-long war of independence, a border conflict with Ethiopia led to another war.

Another source stated in 2015 that over the previous decade, corruption had become ingrained in Eritrean everyday life, with bribes required for most government services. Other alleged types of corruption include the payments of ransoms for hostages “under the eyes of the government.”

On Transparency International's 2022 Corruption Perceptions Index, Eritrea scored 22 on a scale from 0 ("highly corrupt") to 100 ("very clean"). When ranked by score, Eritrea ranked 162nd among the 180 countries in the Index, where the country ranked first is perceived to have the most honest public sector.  For comparison, the best score was 90 (ranked 1), and the worst score was 12 (ranked 180). Eritrea's score in recent years has declined from a high of 25 in 2012 to as low as 18 in 2014-2017.

Background

Eritrea was a part of Ethiopia until 1991, when Eritreans won a civil war that had lasted for thirty years and were granted independence. After a UN-supervised referendum, in which Eritreans voted overwhelmingly for independence, Eritrea declared its independence in 1993. At that time, Eritrea had a weak private sector with few skilled workers, a situation that led the government to take steps to build a strong private sector. During the 1990s, the private sector began to flourish and the economy grew significantly, causing many observers in the West to view Eritrea “as a beacon of Africa.” The decades of war, however, had planted the seeds of many social and economic problems, corruption among them.

A 1998 border conflict with Ethiopia led to another war, which ended in 2000. Despite the official end of the war, warfare has continued on a lower scale. Meanwhile the regime has been accused of clamping down on free speech, shutting down private newspapers, shrinking the private sector, and imposing indefinite military service. All of these moves against individual liberty, human rights, and the free market have been factors in increased corruption. As of 2006, Eritrea had not yet held free elections; the Constitution adopted at the time of independence had not yet been implemented; the president was ruling by decree; the National Assembly had last met in 2002; opposition parties were prohibited, as were civic organizations, the right to assemble, and freedom of the press; the judiciary was inactive; the ruling party, government, and military formed “one single conglomerate of power” with “a low level of transparency.” Since 2001, civil liberties had been “gradually restricted,” with “numerous arbitrary arrests” and human-rights violations on an “alarming” scale. From 126th place on Transparency International's 2009 Corruption Perceptions Index, Eritrea dropped to 134th in 2012 and 166th in 2014.

The increase in state ownership in Eritrea has been critiqued as a step back for economic freedom and for doing business generally, partly because it has caused rising corruption. The 2012 Heritage Foundation Index of Economic Freedom named Eritrea the second-worst country in sub-Saharan Africa for economic liberty. The World Bank's Ease of Doing Business Project Index for 2011 ranked Eritrea at 180th, with only three countries, Guinea Bissau, Central African Republic, and Chad, scoring worse. It has been suggested that since the government maintains control over foreign exchange, friends of government personnel are allowed to bring goods into the country and sell them at great profit, thus increasing opportunities for corruption. Nonetheless, economic growth has been very strong since 2011, largely because of country's mining boom, which has placed Eritea among the fastest growing nations on earth; but corruption has kept this new wealth from reaching as many people as it might have. At the same time, the country has also been ravaged by drought.

Factors

Among the supposed factors breeding corruption in Eritrea is the intense concentration of power. The Eritrean Constitution calls for a separation of powers among the judiciary, executive, and legislative branches, but this has never been implemented. Isaias Afwerki, who has been president since 1993, has usurped the Congress's constitutional powers and is generally viewed as being all-powerful. The 19-member Executive Council consists entirely of presidential cronies. Eritrea's business community is composed mainly of personal associates of the regime's economic officials, fronts for top-level officials of the ruling party, and people who “enjoy the patronage of senior officers of the security and military establishments.” The government “controls all foreign exchanges” and is “virtually the only legal source of imports,” a situation that makes it possible for military and government officials to profit by collaborating with illegal smugglers. Similarly, the country's strict laws about importation and the inconsistency in the granting of exit visas enable customs and immigration officials to profit from bribery and money laundering. A 2014 report has described institutional corruption has "erode[d] the foundations" of economic development. The state's control on the economy allows for little private investment, while extremely low government salaries encourage corruption.

An additional factor in the spread and persistence of corruption is the lack of an independent press to report on it. Eritrea has been described as “Africa's biggest prison for the media.” The only news media are government-owned, and experts compare them to the Soviet media.

Judiciary
The 1997 Eritrean Constitution calls for a judiciary that is independent from parliament. None of this has been implemented, however. Instead there is a judicial system consisting of two separate court systems: Regular Courts that adjudicate disputes based on law and Special Courts that adjudicate disputes that are not based on law. The latter courts are supposed to address corruption, but are themselves considered by Amnesty International and other experts to be “one of the most corrupt and inhumane court systems” globally.

Military
A 2013 report by Transparency International UK called Eritrea the “most militarised country in Africa,” with about 20% of its population in uniform. For this reason, many have called Eritrea the 'North Korea' of Africa. The army is not only large but also one of the nine most corrupt armed forces in the world, along with Algeria, Angola, Cameroon, the DRC, Egypt, Libya, Syria, and Yemen. According to TI, there is a possible scheme in place of public funds earmarked for "secret" military purposes in the name of national security which are in truth appropriated illicitly. There are said to be several military-owned businesses with “unauthorised private enterprise by military personnel.”

Nationalization
In 1996, Eritrea's government declared that all land would henceforth be considered the property of the state and would be re-distributed in accordance with need. It then confiscated a good deal of private land and turned it over to former soldiers, foreign investors, and resettlement programs. The 1990s also saw the privatization of some companies, and since 2000 the government has increasingly intervened in the economy and commerce and propagandized against private trade and business. These activities have involved a considerable amount of favoritism, kickbacks, and other forms of corruption.

Mining Industry
In July 2013, Martin Plaut reported that since 2011, the government had earned over $900 million from the Bisha gold mine, but it was not known what had happened to the money. Even as the state was reportedly amassing huge mining profits, Plaut charged, poverty and hardship were worsening. "There is some evidence," he stated, "that show the [government] is gambling and squandering state resources without any accountability."

Persecution of Christians
Eritrea, as of 2011, was one of 8 nations considered to be Countries of Particular Concern (CPC) by the US State Department owing to the abuse and persecution of Christians other than those belonging to the three recognized denominations: the Eritrean Orthodox Tewahedo Church, the Eritrean Catholic Church, and the Evangelical Lutheran Church of Eritrea. “Up to 3,000 Christians from unregistered church groups were held in detention” in 2011, according to Amnesty International. Between 2002 and 2011, many churches were closed, and tens of thousands of Christians fled the country; state-owned media have told the public that suppressed Christian groups were being paid by the CIA to destabilize the government, and have actively encouraged citizens to turn in persons whom they suspect of holding prayer meetings in their homes. This mass religious persecution has provided an opportunity for extensive corruption of a specific kind on the part of ruling-party politicians and military officials, who have arrested suspected Christians under the country's official anti-Christian policy and held them in prisons, unofficial detention centers, and military barracks in exchange for ransom.

Anti-corruption efforts
There is reportedly no real organized effort in Eritrea to combat corruption. The regime has been described as using a “so-called war on corruption” to crack down on political dissenters and opponents. In May 2015, the president urged a group of party and government officials to discuss American and European pressure on Eritrea to reform its government and release detainees, yet when some of those officials proposed that the government reform in certain areas to appease Western nations that send aid to Eritrea, the president underscored the need to stand up to pressure from the “hegemonic West.” Business leaders in Eritrea were reportedly “shivering with fear” over what the president's comments might signify; it was said to be unclear if the rumors signified a wave of jailing or not. Shortly after the aforementioned meeting, the president addressed the country on the 24th anniversary of Eritrean independence, denouncing “deluded and corrupt” state officials who, he charged, amassed wealth illegitimately. “Such deplorable practices of corruption and theft,” said the president, “must be combated vigorously.”

Eritrea is one of the few nations that has neither ratified nor signed the United Nations Convention against Corruption.

See also
 International Anti-Corruption Academy
 Group of States Against Corruption
 International Anti-Corruption Day
 ISO 37001 Anti-bribery management systems
 OECD Anti-Bribery Convention
 Transparency International

References

External links

 
Eritrea
Society of Eritrea
Crime in Eritrea
Politics of Eritrea
Eritrea
Law of Eritrea
Economy of Eritrea
Government of Eritrea
Social issues in Eritrea